The sargassum pipefish (Syngnathus pelagicus) is a species of pipefish found in the western Atlantic: Maine (United States), Bermuda, northern Gulf of Mexico to Argentina, Nova Scotia, Antilles, and western Caribbean Sea from Yucatan to Colombia. It is a marine subtropical species, up to  maximal length. This is a little-studied species which is found in floating rafts of Sargassum weed where they are believed to feed on planktonic crustacea. Like other pipefish, this is an ovoviviparous species in which the male carries the fertilised eggs in a brood pouch located under his tail.

References

External links
 

sargassum pipefish
Fish of the Eastern United States
Fish of the Caribbean
sargassum pipefish
sargassum pipefish